The 24th Division was one of the divisions of the Spanish Republican Army that were organized during the Spanish Civil War on the basis of mixed brigades. Throughout the war, the unit was deployed on the Andalusian, Madrid, Aragon and Segre fronts, taking part in some of the main battles.

History 
It was created on 3 April 1937, as a reserve of the Southern Army. During the previous weeks the division had been organizing in Alcaracejos, around the 25th Mixed Brigade. In June it joined the 9th Army Corps.

The command of the unit was assumed by Miguel Gallo Martínez, former head of the 6th Mixed Brigade. The 24th Division subsequently moved to the Central front and took part in the Battle of Brunete, attacking south of Madrid. Shortly after, it was urgently sent to the Teruel front, where it participated in the arrest of the Francoist counteroffensive on the Albarracín sector, In July 1937, it also took part in the second phase of the Battle of Belchite.  On 15 November 1937, Gallo took command of the 10th Army Corps, and was replaced as division commander by Miguel Yoldi Beroiz. By then the unit had its headquarters in Lagata. During the following months the 24th Division remained at the Aragon front, without intervening in relevant military operations.

In March 1938, when the Aragon Offensive took place, the division was unable to withstand the impact of the nationalist attack and undertook a disorganized retreat, during which it apparently ran out of ammunition. The division was disbanded on 12 March, although it was recreated again on 19 March with the 19th, 104th and 143rd mixed brigades. The command was handed over to Antonio Ortiz Ramírez, former commander of the 25th Division and an anarchist. After the end of the nationalist offensives, the 24th Division established its defensive positions around the Segre River. Its headquarters were established in Artesa de Segre.

At the beginning of July 1938, Ortiz left the command of the unit, fleeing to France; This prompted his replacement with Miguel García Vivancos, who was given the order to capture and shoot him. During the rest of the year the 24th Division did not intervene in relevant operations. At the end of 1938 it was under the command of Hermenegildo Roca Oliver. As part of the 24th Army Corps, it was deployed on the Ebro front.

It took part in the first phase of the Catalonia Offensive, without much success. On 17 January 1939, the unit, strongly broken and disorganized, ended up being dissolved. The remains of the unit were used to reinforce the 43rd Division, while Major Roca Oliver assumed command of the unmade 56th Division.

Command 
Commanders
 Miguel Gallo Martínez (from April 1937);
 Miguel Yoldi Beroiz (from December 1937);
 Antonio Ortiz Ramírez (from March 1938);
 Miguel García Vivancos (from July 1938);
 Hermenegildo Roca Oliver (from November 1938);

Commissars
 José Gallardo Moreno, of the PCE;
 Francisco Señer Martín, of the CNT;

Chiefs of staff
 José Guarner Vivancos (from July 1937);

Notes

References

Bibliography
 
 
 
 
 
 
 
 
 
 
 

Military units and formations established in 1937
Military units and formations disestablished in 1939
Divisions of Spain
Military units and formations of the Spanish Civil War
Military history of Spain
Armed Forces of the Second Spanish Republic
1937 establishments in Spain
1939 disestablishments in Spain